Acrise is an ecclesiastical and civil parish in the Folkestone and Hythe district, Kent, England, located between Elham and Densole and about six miles north of Folkestone. The settlement derives its name from Old English, 'Acrise' being a development of the Old English term for "Oak Rise", the parish being on a small hill, still populated with old oak trees.

The parish includes three particularly significant buildings. The 18th century Acrise Place is a manor house. The medieval church of St Martin (which now stands within the grounds of the big house) is of Norman origin. The Old Rectory is a very fine example of a parsonage dwelling of its era and is a grade II listed building.

References

External links
 
 Friends of St Martin's Church, Acrise
 St Martin's Church, Acrise
 

Civil parishes in Kent
Villages in Kent
Folkestone and Hythe District